Radhanagar is a census town within the jurisdiction of the Sonarpur police station in the Sonarpur CD block in the Baruipur subdivision of the South 24 Parganas district in the Indian state of West Bengal.

Geography

Area overview
Baruipur subdivision is a rural subdivision with moderate levels of urbanization. 31.05% of the population lives in the urban areas and 68.95% lives in the rural areas. In the northern portion of the subdivision (shown in the map alongside) there are 10 census towns. The entire district is situated in the Ganges Delta and the northern part of the subdivision is a flat plain bordering the metropolis of Kolkata.

Note: The map alongside presents some of the notable locations in the subdivision. All places marked in the map are linked in the larger full screen map.

Location

Demographics
According to the 2011 Census of India, Radhanagar had a total population of 6,675, of which 3,375 (51%) were males and 3,300 (49%) were females. There were 711 persons below the age of 6. The total number of literate persons in Radhanagar was 4,302 (72.13% of the population over 6 years).

Infrastructure
According to the District Census Handbook 2011, Radhanagar covered an area of 5.2894 km2. Sonarpur Junction railway station is 5 km away. Among the civic amenities, the protected water supply involved service reservoir. It had 619 domestic electric connections. Among the medical facilities it had 1 dispensary/ health centre 1 km away, a nursing home 2 km away and 2 medicine shops in the town. Among the educational facilities it had were 2 primary schools.

Transport
Sonarpur-Chak Baria Road links Radhanagar to the State Highway 1.

Sonarpur Junction railway station is located nearby.

Healthcare
Sonarpur Rural Hospital, with 25 beds, at Rajpur Sonarpur, is the major government medical facility in the Sonarpur CD block.

References

Cities and towns in South 24 Parganas district
Neighbourhoods in Kolkata
Kolkata Metropolitan Area